La pecora nera, internationally released as The Black Sheep, is a 1968 Italian comedy film directed by Luciano Salce.

For his performance Ettore Mattia won the Nastro d'Argento for best supporting actor.

Cast 
 Vittorio Gassman: Mario/Filippo Agasti
 Lisa Gastoni: Alma 
 Adrienne La Russa: Kitty 
 Ettore Mattia: Minister Mattia
 Antonio Centa: Mannocchi
 Umberto D'Orsi: Roberto Franceschini, aka "Pampero"
 James Riley: Felix Désiré Tombalassa  
 Ennio Balbo: Senator Galletti 
 Giampiero Albertini: Senator Santarini
 Fiorenzo Fiorentini: commissioner
 Eugene Walter: Priest

References

External links

1968 films
Italian comedy films
1968 comedy films
Films directed by Luciano Salce
Commedia all'italiana
Politics in fiction
Films scored by Luis Bacalov
1960s Italian films